The Charlottetown City Council is the governing body for the city of Charlottetown, the county seat of Queen's County, Prince Edward Island, Canada. The most recent civic election took place in November 5, 2018. City council meets at Charlottetown City Hall.

Mayor
 Philip Brown (2018–present)

Councillors

See also
List of mayors of Charlottetown

References

External links
 City of Charlottetown: Mayor and Council 

Municipal councils in Prince Edward Island
Politics of Charlottetown